Héctor Arnaldo Sanabria (29 August 1985 – 27 August 2013) was an Argentine professional footballer who played as a striker.

Career
Sanabria played for Nueva Chicago, Flandria, Deportivo Merlo, Fénix, Argentino, Pérez Zeledón, Malacateco and Laferrere.

Later life and death
Sanabria died on 27 August 2013, at the age of 27, following a heart attack during a match.

References

1985 births
2013 deaths
Argentine footballers
Argentine expatriate footballers
Association football forwards
Nueva Chicago footballers
Flandria footballers
Deportivo Merlo footballers
Club Atlético Fénix players
Municipal Pérez Zeledón footballers
C.D. Malacateco players
Deportivo Laferrere footballers
Argentine expatriate sportspeople in Costa Rica
Argentine expatriate sportspeople in Guatemala
Expatriate footballers in Costa Rica
Expatriate footballers in Guatemala